The University of Santo Tomas College of Fine Arts and Design, popularly known as UST–CFAD, is the fine arts school of the University of Santo Tomas, the oldest and the largest Catholic university in Manila, Philippines.

History
The college originated from the original College of Architecture and Fine Arts (CAFA) founded in 1946. In 1785, the Dominicans made the first attempt to invest art and painting with academic value and formal presence and not merely an accessory to missionary work. That year when Fr. Juan Amador was Rector-chancellor of the university, the Academia de Bellas Artes was opened. The school, however, was not firmly established and its influence was not far-reaching for it was founded as an experiment. Its training on painting functioned only for a short time because there were few enrollees to that course. The Academia later became one of the Estudios de Adorno that existed in the University of Santo Tomas, Ateneo de Manila, and Colegio de San Juan de Letran. Thus in 1935, the Dominicans merely reestablished the fine art school with the primary goal of meeting the ever-present and increasing demand for good catholic artists. It was to be an institution designed to conform to the latest and most advanced artistic theories and practices.

From 1935 to 1939, students chose from two areas specialization, interior design and public school arts. Interior design was offered in order to meet the demands for professional interior designers due to construction and remodeling activities that were greater than ever. Public school art, according to Victorio Edades (the first school director), an answer to the immediate need of preparing future teachers of arts for private and public schools.

UST was the first Philippine school to introduce interior design as a fine arts major in 1954.

In 2000, the Department of Fine Arts separated from the College of Architecture. In 2002, the two colleges transferred to the Beato Angelico Building.

Academic programs
 Undergraduate programs
 Bachelor of Fine Arts (major in advertising arts, industrial design, and painting)
 Bachelor of Science in Interior Design
 Graduate programs
 Master of Fine Arts

Notable people
The college has produced numerous national artists like Victorio Edades, Jerry Navarro Elizalde, and Ang Kiukok for Visual Arts. Ildefonso Santos Jr, Juan Nakpil, and Leandro Locsin for Architecture. Ronnie del Carmen, codirector of the Pixar film Inside Out, is an alumnus of CFAD.

References

Educational institutions established in 2000
Fine Arts and Design, College of
Design schools
Art schools in the Philippines
2000 establishments in the Philippines